The Finisterre–Huon languages comprise the largest family within the Trans–New Guinea languages (TNG) in the classification of Malcolm Ross. They were part of the original TNG proposal, and William A. Foley considers their TNG identity to be established. The languages share a small closed class of verbs taking pronominal object prefixes some of which are cognate (Suter 2012), strong morphological evidence that they are related.

History of classification
Huon and Finisterre, and then the connection between them, were identified by Kenneth McElhanon (1967, 1970). When McElhanon compared notes with his colleague Clemens Voorhoeve, who was working on the languages of southern Irian Jaya, they developed the concept of Trans–New Guinea. Apart from the evidence which unites them, the Finisterre and Huon families are clearly valid language families in their own right, each consisting of several fairly-well defined branches. (See Finisterre languages and Huon languages.)

Pronouns
Ross (2005) reconstructs the pronouns as follows:

{| class="wikitable"
! !!sg!!du!!pl
|-
!1
|*na||*na-t, *ni-t||*na-n, *n-in
|-
!2
|*ga||*ja-ł, *ji-ł, *gi-ł||*ja-n, *ji-n, *gi-n
|-
!3
|*[y]a, *wa, *i||*ya-ł, *i-ł||*ya-n, *i-n
|}

These are not all coherent:  3sg *ya and *i are found in Huon, for example, while 3sg *wa is found in Finisterre.  In other cases, however, the multiple forms are found in both branches.

Vocabulary comparison
The following basic vocabulary words are from McElhanon & Voorhoeve (1970) and McElhanon (1967), as cited in the Trans-New Guinea database:

{| class="wikitable sortable"
! gloss !! Kâte !! Kovai !! Selepet
|-
! head
| kpitsec- || buno || kun; kun-
|-
! hair
| dzâwâ- ||  || somot; somot-
|-
! ear
| hatsec- || ano || âdâp-; ɔndɔp
|-
! eye
| dzâŋe- || dziŋo || sen; sen-
|-
! nose
| sâke- || samo || hâme-; hɔme
|-
! tooth
| mic- || dzɔŋɔ || sât-; sot
|-
! tongue
| nameŋ- || biŋio || nibilam-; nimbilam
|-
! louse
| imeŋ || apalau || imen
|-
! dog
| kpâto || goun || soso
|-
! bird
| wipe || naŋ || nâi; nɔi
|-
! blood
| soc- ||  || hep-
|-
! bone
| siec- || yo || haǥit; hahit-
|-
! skin
| sahac- || siŋlo || hâk-; hɔk
|-
! breast
| moŋ- || suyo || nam; nam-
|-
! tree
| yâc ||  || nak
|-
! man
| ŋic ||  || lok
|-
! woman
| ŋokac ||  || apet; ibi
|-
! sky
| sambâŋ ||  || hibim
|-
! sun
| dzoaŋ || sual || dewutâ; dewutɔ
|-
! moon
| mosa ||  || emesenŋe
|-
! water
| opâ || lap || to
|-
! fire
|  || puŋ || kɔlɔp
|-
! stone
| kpânâ ||  || kât; kɔt
|-
! road, path
| hata || atam || giop
|-
! name
| dzâne- ||  || kut; kut-
|-
! eat
| nâ- ||  || ne; ni-
|-
! one
| mocyaha ||  || konok
|-
! two
| yayahec ||  || yâhâp
|}

Evolution

Finisterre-Huon reflexes of proto-Trans-New Guinea (pTNG) etyma are:

Kâte language:
bɔruŋ ‘flame’ < *mbalaŋ ‘flame’
butoŋ ‘fingernail’ < *mb(i,u)t(i,u)C
bekɔ ‘orphan’ < *mbVŋga(-masi)
masiŋ ‘widow’ < *masi
sambɔŋ ‘sky’ < *sambV ‘cloud’
tofeʔ ‘saliva’ < *si(mb,p)atV
lo- ‘take’ < *(nd,t)a-
munduŋ ‘inner yolk of egg’ < *mundun ‘internal organs’
go ‘2sg’ < *ŋga
hɔmo- ‘die’ < *kumV-
bɔriʔ ‘glitter, flash of lightning’ < *(m,mb)elak ‘light, lightning’
mi ‘not’ < *ma- ‘not’
maŋu(zo) ‘to vomit’ < *mV(k,ŋ)V t(e,i)-
ame(ʔ) ‘breast’ < *amu
tsimin(uŋ) ‘stiff coarse hair’ < *[nd,s]umu[n,t]V ‘hair’
imeŋ ‘louse’ < *iman ‘louse’
no ‘1sg’ < *na ‘1sg’
nɔ- ‘eat’ < *na-

Selepet language:
balam ‘flame’ < *mbalaŋ
(ni)bilim ‘tongue’ < *mbilaŋ
kɔlɔp ‘fire’ < *kend(o,u)p
kɔlip ‘long’ < *kuta(mb,p)(a,u)
irak ‘new’ < *kVtak
sak ‘sand’ < *sa(ŋg,k)asin
somot ‘hair’ < *(s,nd)umu(n,t)[V]
madu ‘orphan’ < *masi
si- ‘burn’ < *nj(a,e,i)- ‘burn’
ga ‘2sg’ < *ŋga
kaku- ‘carry on shoulder’ < *kakV-
kɔu ‘ashes’ < *kambu ‘ashes’
belek ‘lightning’ < *(m,mb)elak
ibi ‘name’ < *imbi
mete ‘forehead’ < *me(n,t)e ‘head’
man- ‘live, dwell’ < *mVn[a]- 
imen ‘louse’ < *iman ‘louse’
(n)am ‘breast, milk’ < *amu ‘breast’

Footnotes

References

 Suter, Edgar (2012). Verbs with pronominal object prefixes in Finisterre–Huon languages. In: Harald Hammarström and Wilco van den Heuvel (eds.). History, contact and classification of Papuan languages. [Special Issue 2012 of Language and Linguistics in Melanesia]. 23-58. Port Moresby: Linguistic Society of Papua New Guinea.

Further reading
Ross, Malcolm. 2014. Proto-Finisterre-Huon. TransNewGuinea.org.

 
Languages of Papua New Guinea
Morobe–Eastern Highlands languages